A Wimmelbilderbuch (German, literally "teeming picture book"), wimmelbook, or hidden picture book is a type of large-format, wordless picture book. It is characterized by full-spread drawings (sometimes across gatefold pages) depicting scenes richly detailed with humans, animals, and objects. Typically made for children, the drawings are filled with characters and items that may be discovered.

Hieronymus Bosch, Pieter Brueghel the Elder and Hans Jurgen Press are regarded as the fathers of the format.  Contemporary wimmelbook authors include Richard Scarry, Ali Mitgutsch, Rotraut Susanne Berner, and Eva Scherbarth. In the United Kingdom and the United States, wimmelbooks gained popularity with the success of the Where's Wally? series by the British illustrator Martin Handford.

See also 
 Hidden object game

References

Further reading 

 Cornelia Rémi: Wimmelbooks. In: Bettina Kümmerling-Meibauer (ed.): Routledge Companion to Picturebooks, London, New York: Routledge, 2017, 158–168. 

Books by type